Vilya may refer to:
Vilya (urban-type settlement), an urban-type settlement in Nizhny Novgorod Oblast, Russia
Vilya, one of the Three Rings from J. R. R. Tolkien's Middle-earth legendarium
Vilya, a diminutive of the Russian male first name Avel